Vijay Jethi (born 2 December 1994) is an Indian cricketer. He made his List A debut for Uttarakhand in the 2018–19 Vijay Hazare Trophy on 6 October 2018. He made his first-class debut on 3 January 2020, for Uttarakhand in the 2019–20 Ranji Trophy. He made his Twenty20 debut on 4 November 2021, for Uttarakhand in the 2021–22 Syed Mushtaq Ali Trophy.

References

External links
 

1994 births
Living people
Indian cricketers
Uttarakhand cricketers
Place of birth missing (living people)